Ecuador competed at the 1984 Summer Paralympics in Stoke Mandeville, Great Britain and New York City, United States. 2 competitors from Ecuador won no medals and so did not place in the medal table.

See also 
 Ecuador at the Paralympics
 Ecuador at the 1984 Summer Olympics

References 

Ecuador at the Paralympics
Nations at the 1984 Summer Paralympics